Aaptos lobata is a species of sea sponge belonging to the family Suberitidae. The species was described in 2017. The holotype was collected in the Makassar Strait.

References

External links
Aaptos lobata: occurrence data from GBIF

Aaptos
Animals described in 2017